Horace Newton (1844–1920) was a priest within the Church of England, philanthropist, and country landowner.

Life
He lived at the country house of Holmwood, Redditch, Worcestershire, which he had built for him in 1892–3 by Temple Lushington Moore (the architect was his nephew by marriage). He bought the land from the Earl of Plymouth.

A deeply religious man, he inherited upon the death of his father William Newton II of Barrells Hall and Whateley Hall (both in Warwickshire), with his brothers T.H. Goodwin Newton and Rev. William Newton III, what was described at the time as "an absurdly large fortune". The family owned large amounts of prime Birmingham land (such as part of New Street, including the site of the current Birmingham New Street station) plus Welsh slate quarries and Bryn Bras Castle, Gwynedd. Ethel Street and Newton Street in Birmingham are named after the family.

The family had a strong Christian upbringing, and despite their vast wealth devoted their life to helping others, giving away large sums of money, building churches (notably in Ullenhall, the estate village of Barrells Hall) and donating to hospitals and various charities. He also built the impressive Beechwood Vicarage near Driffield, Yorkshire, when he was vicar there.

They firmly believed that "with wealth and property come responsibility" and were generous and kind employers at all of their estates.

For relaxation the family spent three months every summer at their Scottish holiday home, the 26,000 acre Glencripesdale Estate, in the 50-room (28 bedroom) Glencripesdale Castle he designed with Goodwin Newton.

Religious work 

Having been educated at St John's College, Cambridge, where he was a Foundation Scholar, and graduating with Mathematical Honours in 1864, he turned to the Church for his career and life's work.

He was ordained Deacon in 1865, and Priest in 1866, by Bishop Jackson of Lincoln, and was curate of St Mary's in Nottingham.

In 1869 he was appointed first vicar of Heworth, near York, and in 1878 he was appointed by Archbishop Thomson to the vicarage of Great-With-Little-Driffield.

He became a canon of York Minster in 1885, having been presented to the Archbishop of York for a canonry, based on his services as Vicar of Driffield. While incumbent there he was noted for his generosity and kindness, giving away many millions of pounds including circa £500,000 (in 2009 money) for the rebuilding of Driffield Church from his own wealth. He employed many church people, having three curates and two scripture readers in his personal employ.

He was vicar of Redditch 1892–1905, and thereafter lived at Holmwood, Redditch (which he had built for him by the architect Temple Lushington Moore, who was also a relative), having been offered the post by Lord Windsor.

Legacy 
In the 1970s, when the Kingfisher Shopping Centre was opened in Redditch an office block was named after him within the centre: Canon Newton House. Part of the centre, known as Milward Square, is also named after the family of one of his daughters, Elsie, who married Harry Milward of Milward's Needles.

Family 
Canon Newton married twice:

Firstly to Frances (Fanny) Storrs in 1866, the younger daughter of Dr Robert Storrs of Doncaster, the first Doctor to note the connection with cleanliness and infection during child birth, years before the more famous Ignaz Semmelweis.

Secondly he married in 1905 Katharine Constance Macrell  (died 1921) following the death of Fanny Storrs.

Canon Newton and his first wife, Fanny Storrs, had seven children:

Ethel – married Bishop Edmund Arbuthnott Knox, the evangelical Bishop of Manchester and prayerbook reformer
Madeleine
Elsie – married Harry Milward, one of the heirs to the Milward's Needles dynasty
Margaret
Dorathea
Marjorie
Horace – died in 1917, having drowned in the Tigris, Basra, Iraq (then called Mesopotamia) with the 13th Hussars. He was buried in Ezra's Tomb.

References

19th-century English Anglican priests
English philanthropists
1844 births
1920 deaths